Kösching is a municipality in the district of Eichstätt in Bavaria in Germany.

Personalities  
 Richard Scheringer (1904-1986), communist politician
 Johanna Scheringer-Wright (born 1963) politician (The Left), member of the Landtag of Thuringia
 Serkan Atak (born 1984), German-Turkish footballer
 Rudolf Winterstein (1920-2000), Heimatpfleger

References

Eichstätt (district)